Mondariz is a town and municipality in the province of Pontevedra, autonomous community of Galicia, Spain. It has a population of 4,440 inhabitants.

Geography

Parishes
The municipality of Mondariz is formed by 12 parroquias (civil parishes). These parroquias can be further subdivided into lugares/aldeas (hamlets).

 Frades
 Gargamala
 Lougares
 Meirol
 Mondariz
 Mouriscados
 Queimadelos
 Riofrío
 Sabaxáns
 Toutón
 Vilar
 Vilasobroso

Governance
The municipality is administered by the Concello de Mondariz (Mondariz town council) consisting of a mayor and 12 councillors. Since 2019 municipal elections the municipality have been controlled by the Galician Nationalist Bloc, with the support of People's Party and Socialist Party.

References

Municipalities in the Province of Pontevedra